Kerry Hore (born 3 July 1981) is an Australian former rower, a national champion, world-champion and four-time Olympian who competed in the women's quadruple sculls at the 2004, 2008, 2012 and 2016 Summer Olympics. She was in Australian quad sculls which won a 2003 World Championship and a bronze medal at the Athens Olympics.

Personal
Born in Hobart, Tasmania, Hore attended Mt Stuart Primary and The Friends' School in Hobart. She obtained a BPharmacy from the University of Tasmania and works as a pharmacist in Bellerive.

Club and national career
Hore's senior rowing was from the New Norfolk Rowing Club and the Huon Rowing Club in southern Tasmania. Later in Hobart she rowed from the Lindisfarne Rowing Club. Hore consistently represented for her state at the Interstate Regatta within the Australian Rowing Championships. In the thirteen-year period 2003 to 2015 she raced for Tasmania on four occasions in the senior women's eight contesting the Queen Elizabeth Cup and on eight occasions she sculled for the Nell Slatter Cup. She rowed in both boats at the 2003, 2007 and 2008 championships.2011 Aust C'ships

On seven occasions from 2007 to 2014 she competed in New Norfolk colours for the Australian national single sculls title at the Australian Rowing Championships. She placed second in four of those races and finally won that Australian championship title racing in Huon Rowing Club colours in 2014. In 2011 she won she Australian national quad scull title in an Australian selection composite crew.

International career
Hore won gold and the world title at the 2003 World Rowing Championships in Milan rowing in a quad scull with Jane Robinson, Dana Faletic & Amber Bradley. At the 2004 Athens Olympics with Faletic, Bradley and Rebecca Sattin, Hore won the bronze medal in the women's quad.

At Beijing 2008  and London 2012, Hore was in women's quads who progressed through to finals. They finished in sixth place in 2008 and fourth in 2012.

Hore teamed with Kim Crow to win silver medals in the women's double scull at the 2010 and 2011 World Rowing Championships. At the 2010 World Rowing Championships in Lake Karapiro she also raced in the Australian quad scull to a fourth placing.

In Rio 2016 Hore was selected in a crew with Jennifer Cleary, Jessica Hall & Madeleine Edmunds to row the Australian women's quad scull. They finished outside the places in their heat of the Olympic regatta and were eliminated in the repechage. Hore nonetheless became the first Australian female rower to compete at four Olympic Games.

References

External links 

 

1981 births
Living people
Australian female rowers
Sportspeople from Hobart
Rowers at the 2004 Summer Olympics
Rowers at the 2008 Summer Olympics
Rowers at the 2012 Summer Olympics
Olympic bronze medalists for Australia
Olympic rowers of Australia
Olympic medalists in rowing
World Rowing Championships medalists for Australia
Medalists at the 2004 Summer Olympics
Rowers at the 2016 Summer Olympics
21st-century Australian women